Kildin Strait is a strait, located at , separating the island Kildin and the Kola Peninsula, Russia.

Straits of Russia
Bodies of water of Murmansk Oblast